1895 Singapore Amateur Football Association Challenge Cup was the fourth season of the Amateur Challenge Cup, the predecessor of the Singapore Cup.

The Final was played between Royal Artillery and 5th Northumberland Fusiliers I, the former winning 3–1 to win the cup.

Round 1

Round 2

Semi-final

Final

References

Singapore - Singapore Cup tournaments - Additional Data 1892-1961, RSSSF.com

1895
1895–96 domestic association football cups
1895 in Singapore